Aleksandar Katai (born 6 February 1991) is a Serbian professional footballer who plays as a winger for Red Star Belgrade and the  Serbia national team.

Club career

Vojvodina
Katai started playing football for his hometown club FK Vojvodina youth squad. After 6 months loan to lower league team FK Palić at the start of 2009–10 season he was promoted to Vojvodina's first team. His debut in Serbian SuperLiga was on 14 March 2010, when he came in as substitute against FK Čukarički, and he scored his first goal just seven days later in a match against Mladi Radnik. On 28 June 2011, he left FK Vojvodina and went to Athens to join Olympiacos.

Olympiacos
On 24 June 2011, Olympiacos agreed to sign Katai on a four-year contract. At his first trainings with the club, coach Ernesto Valverde told Katai that he did not defend enough and that he needed to improve as a player. Katai did not play a single match for Olympiacos, but was instead sent on loan four times.

He was first loaned to OFI Crete, with whom he made his debut on 5 November 2011, against Panionios. The loan spell to Crete was unsuccessful, and so Olympiacos loaned him back to his hometown club FK Vojvodina. While on loan at Vojvodina, in 2012 after one game with Spartak Subotica, he fell very ill and was admitted to the hospital, where he was diagnosed with thrombopenia. He had to have some blood removed, and stayed in the hospital for two weeks, before he was allowed to finish his recovery from home. During his recovery, he gained over 20 pounds, and he did not return to play football until the end of the year. He remained a loaned player for Vojvodina until the club president Ratko Butorović died unexpectedly on 8 June 2013, which led to a period of instability in the club during which Katai left. He subsequently was loaned to Platanias, for whom he scored a total of eight goals and six assists, until his loan there expired in the summer of 2014.

Red Star Belgrade

2014–15 season
On 31 August 2014, in a last-minute deal before the transfer window closed, Katai devoted to a one-year loan to Red Star Belgrade. Throughout autumn 2014, Katai was reported to be out of shape, and Red Star's coach Nenad Lalatović was said to have claimed that Katai "had a problem in his head".

2015–16 season
On 18 June 2015, it was announced that Katai terminated his contract with Olympiacos and forgave a debt of €300,000 which was owed to him by Red Star from the loan contract, and subsequently signed a two-year contract with Red Star Belgrade. For the 2015–16 season, Miodrag "Grof" Božović was hired as the new coach and Katai played a good game against Kairat in the first qualifying round for the Europa League, although Red Star failed to qualify. By the end of October 2015, Katai had scored 10 goals and made 6 assists in 15 league matches, ranking him one of the most effective midfielders in all of Europe at the time surveyed.

Katai ended the season with the title of the best scorer of the Superliga, scoring his 21st in the last round against Radnički for the 27th title celebration.

2016–17 season
In the first competitive match of the 2016–17 season, Katai scored an equalizer and assist for win against Valletta FC in the first match of the second qualifying round for the Champions League in Valletta and winner in rematch, in Belgrade.
In the first game of the third round of qualification for the Champions League against Bulgarian PFC Ludogorets Razgrad continued his goal-scoring series, with a 12th consecutive goal, when he dribbled past three players and scored, though Red Star were ultimately eliminated.

Alavés
On 31 August 2016, Katai signed a three-year contract with La Liga side Deportivo Alavés, for an undisclosed fee.

Chicago Fire
On 6 February 2018, Katai was loaned by Alavés to Chicago Fire of Major League Soccer. The loan was for the 2018 MLS season, and included a purchase option at season's end.

On 11 July 2018, the Chicago Fire acquired Katai on a permanent basis from Alavés for an unknown amount. The deal had Katai signed through the 2019 season, with a club option for 2020. It also had him remaining a TAM player for the 2018 season, but would change to a DP in 2019.

LA Galaxy
On 31 December 2019, after leaving the Chicago Fire, Katai joined the LA Galaxy through the use of Targeted Allocation Money.  Katai was expected to be an important part of the Galaxy’s attack in 2020.

Katai was released by LA Galaxy on 5 June 2020, following controversial Instagram posts by Katai's wife Tea, in the wake of the George Floyd protests and looting across the United States. Katai's wife, writing in Serbian, had compared protestors to "disgusting cattle," called for violent action against them in a caption under a photo of New York Police Department officers driving an SUV into a crowd of protesters ("shoot those s***s"), and captioned an image of what appears to be a looter running off with boxes of Nike sneakers with "Black Nikes Matter."

The LA Galaxy requested the removal of his wife’s posts, and issued a statement condemning "racism of any kind." Tea then took down the posts.  Katai condemned his wife's posts as "unacceptable", rebuked her insensitivity, issued a personal apology, and indicated his support for the Black Lives Matter movement, in an Instagram post. Two days after the team became aware of the wife's posts, which also was two days after his post condemning her statements, and following a day of protests against Katai, the LA Galaxy released him.

Return to Red Star Belgrade
On 9 July 2020, Katai signed a two-year contract with Red Star Belgrade.

International career
Katai played two games for Serbia U21 national team. He  made his debut for Serbia in a 4–1 friendly loss to the Czech Republic on 13 November 2015.

Personal life
Born in Srbobran, a village in northern Serbia, his paternal grandfather was of Ukrainian origin and his grandmother was Hungarian. His surname is Hungarian, adopted from his grandmother.

Career statistics

Club

International

Honours
Red Star
 Serbian SuperLiga (3): 2015–16, 2020–21, 2021–22
 Serbian Cup (2): 2020–21, 2021–22

Individual
 Serbian SuperLiga top goalscorer: 2015–16
 Serbian SuperLiga Team of the Season: 2015–16

References

External links
 
 
 

Living people
1991 births
People from Srbobran
Association football wingers
Serbian footballers
Serbia international footballers
Serbia under-21 international footballers
FK Palić players
FK Vojvodina players
Olympiacos F.C. players
Platanias F.C. players
OFI Crete F.C. players
Red Star Belgrade footballers
Deportivo Alavés players
Chicago Fire FC players
LA Galaxy players
Serbian SuperLiga players
Super League Greece players
La Liga players
Serbian expatriate footballers
Expatriate footballers in Greece
Expatriate footballers in Spain
Serbian expatriate sportspeople in Greece
Serbian expatriate sportspeople in Spain
Serbian people of Hungarian descent
Serbian people of Ukrainian descent
Major League Soccer players
Designated Players (MLS)